Jinan Metro Line 2 is a rapid transit line in Jinan, China. The line uses six-car Type B rolling stock. The line began operation on 26 March 2021.

Significance 
Prior to the opening of Line 2, Jinan Metro consisted of the separate Line 1 and Line 3 with no means of transfer between them. Line 2 runs east to west and interchanges with both existing lines. It is Jinan's first fully automated (GoA4) subway line.

Stations

References

02
Railway lines opened in 2021